Tiled printing is a method that computer programs use to enable users to print images larger than a standard page, popularized by a program called The Rasterbator. A tiled printing program overlays a grid on the printed image in which each cell (or tile) is the size of a printed page and then prints each tile. A person can then arrange the tiles to reconstruct the full image.

Tiled printing has been widespread since the days of mainframe computers. An early example is the Unix banner program, which in some Unix variants created very large printable text banners out of ASCII characters. Programs were available to convert images to ASCII art that, when printed large enough and viewed sufficiently far away, appeared to be smoothly shaded. Modern software may use halftoning to achieve a similar effect.

Another form of tiled printing, inspired by continuous feed printers, involves making a long message of letters, possibly with inline graphics of the same height, and printing it sideways over several pages to make a banner. This type of printing is usually associated with The Print Shop, a 1980s software package.

Since high resolution images are used to create the prints, a large amount of ink is used in the process of making tiled prints. Inexpensive ink jet printers now allow people to make tiled printouts that do not sacrifice the original image's resolution at reasonable cost. These decorations are sometimes called rasterbations, after a popular tiled printing program, "The Rasterbator." The Rasterbator program accepts users' images and divides them into a grid format. Users can specify how big the final product should be, in terms of pages. The Rasterbator then produces PDF images that when printed out, form the entire picture.

World records

Rasterbation is often the subject of record-breaking attempts to create the largest and most impressive tiled prints. The title of the world's largest rasterbation was previously held by "the Doomtech crew". However, in June 2007 the graduating class of the University of Toronto Schools, a Toronto high school, produced a rasterbation incorporating 1462 sheets of "×14" legal-sized paper. This achievement surpassed the previous record by over two hundred sheets, but then was overtaken by a group from Groton School in May 2008. The Groton School Rasterbation used more than 1500 sheets of 11x14" paper and was 100' tall, making it the largest ever.

In June 2012, another graduating class from the University of Toronto Schools produced 74  rasterbations in one night, each incorporating 143 sheets of ×11" letter-sized paper, for a record-shattering total of 10,582 sheets. Each rasterbation included the face of one of the graduating students with a doorway cut out of his or her gaping mouth - altogether, they created a corridor of mouths throughout the school's hallways.

In March 2013, a  rasterbation of Edvard Munchs iconic painting The Scream was created at Norway's largest computer party The Gathering (TG), as part of the art project "Scream from nature". It is the largest known reprint of any Munch painting. The rasterbation, made by the crew at Sørlanet, consisted of 1,517 (37 × 41) sheets of A4 paper, and measured .

References

External links

Applications 
 Pufferizer - a free tiled printing application for Android devices and is designed for printing on standard photo papers
 Tileprint - a free tiled printing application for iOS-devices
 The Rasterbator - a popular tiled printing application for Windows, which is free and open source software
 The Rasterbator Online - official online version of The Rasterbator
 Rasterbator-NG - a Mono-based Rasterbator version
 Block Posters - online application that creates any size pdf posters from up to 1 MB images (free)
 PosteRazor - a graphical multi-platform tiled printing application that takes bitmap images as input and creates a multi-page PDF document (free)
 pdfposter - a command line tiled printing application for PDF files (free)
 poster(1) - a command line tiled printing application for PostScript files (free)

Articles 
 "Freebie Rasterbator Makes Arty-Looking Posters" - PC World, April 8, 2010
 "Turn Photos Into Wall-Size Posters", PC World, May 13, 2009
 "Rasterbate in your dorm room", Dakota Student, August 25, 2006
 "Rasterbate More: Slap a pixelated Larry on your wall", The Harvard Crimson, December 9, 2004

Computer printers
Photographic techniques